Frederick County is the name of two counties in the United States.

 Frederick County, Maryland
 Frederick County, Virginia